Treponema azotonutricium is a bacterium, the first termite gut spirochete to be isolated, together with Treponema primitia.

References

Further reading
Maier, Raina M., Ian L. Pepper, and Charles P. Gerba, eds. Environmental microbiology. Vol. 397. Academic press, 2009.
Berlanga, Mercedes. "Pathogenic Treponema. Molecular and cellular biology."International Microbiology 10.1 (2010): 72.

External links

LPSN
Type strain of Treponema azotonutricium at BacDive -  the Bacterial Diversity Metadatabase

azotonutricium
Bacteria described in 2004